Theodor von Holleben (18 September 1838 Stettin, Pomerania – 31 January 1913 Berlin) was a German diplomat.

Biography
Holleben was educated at the universities of Heidelberg, Berlin and Göttingen; became an officer in the Bodyguard Hussar Regiment; and took part in the Franco-Prussian War. He entered the diplomatic service in 1872; was chargé d'affaires at Beijing, China, 1873–1874, and at Tokyo, Japan, in 1875; minister at Buenos Aires 1876-1884, at Tokyo 1885-1889, and at Washington, D.C., 1892-93. In 1897 he became ambassador extraordinary and plenipotentiary to the United States. At the command of Emperor William, he, together with Secretary John Hay, of the State Department, had charge of the arrangements for the official reception of the emperor's brother, Admiral Prince Henry, in February 1902. Failing health together with his inability to have President Roosevelt arbitrate the German-Venezuelan dispute caused his resignation, and in 1903 he was succeeded by Baron Hermann Speck von Sternburg.

While serving in the US, von Holleben received an Honorary doctorate (LL.D.) from Harvard University in June 1901. After the successful visit to the United States of Prince Henry of Prussia in March 1902, the Emperor conferred upon von Holleben the Order of the Red Eagle, first class with Oak leaves.

Orders and decorations
  Kingdom of Prussia:
 Landeswehr Service Medal, 1st Class
 Iron Cross (1870), 2nd Class
 Knight of Justice of the Johanniter Order, 13 February 1874
 Knight of the Order of the Red Eagle, 4th Class, 18 January 1879; 2nd Class with Oak Leaves, 18 January 1891; with Crown, 16 September 1893; 1st Class, March 1902
 Knight of the Royal Order of the Crown, 1st Class
 : Grand Cross of the Order of the White Falcon
 :
 Grand Cross of the Friedrich Order, 1893
 Grand Cross of the Order of the Württemberg Crown, 1897
 : Commander of the Imperial Austrian Order of Franz Joseph
 : Grand Cordon of the Order of the Rising Sun
 : Commander of the Royal and Distinguished Order of Charles III, 2nd Class

References

Sources

Further reading
 Roosevelt, Theodore, An Autobiography (New York, 1913)

1838 births
1913 deaths
Members of the Prussian House of Lords
Heidelberg University alumni
Humboldt University of Berlin alumni
University of Göttingen alumni
Ambassadors of Germany to Argentina
Ambassadors of Germany to the United States
Recipients of the Iron Cross (1870), 2nd class
Commanders of the Order of Franz Joseph
Grand Cordons of the Order of the Rising Sun